Coal Banks Trail is a 30-kilometre multipurpose recreational path in Lethbridge, Alberta, Canada. It connects all of the city's major urban parks, all three geographical areas, and many smaller parks. While 
primarily a community recreation opportunity, the trail is also used for community events, such as the Terry Fox Run and the Moonlight Run.

The system now reaches Highways 4 and 5 in the south and a loop in West Lethbridge (including University Drive and McMaster Blvd).

History

Named after the original settlement in the river valley, most of the original trail was built between 1984 and 1987 as part of the city's Urban Parks Project. The 7 km expansion around West Lethbridge was completed in 1996.

In the late 1980s, repeated floods of the Oldman River washed out a causeway section near the Lethbridge Country Club golf course. Unable to obtain approval from the federal government to rebuild the section, Lethbridge City Council decided to build a link to 4 St and Scenic Drive South in 2004.

Parks serviced

Botterill Bottom Park
Bull Trail Park
Helen Schuler Nature Reserve
Henderson Park
Indian Battle Park
Nicholas Sheran Park
Pavan Park

References

See also

Transportation in Lethbridge

Parks in Lethbridge
Transport in Lethbridge